The Westfriedhof (West Cemetery) in Munich is situated in the south of the city district of Moosach. The main entrance is at Baldurstraße 28. The cemetery was laid out in 1898; the buildings, by the architect Hans Grässel, were completed in 1902. The Westfriedhof contains over 40,000 grave plots. The monuments in the principal avenue, many of them by the Munich sculptor Heinrich Waderé, are especially imposing.

Graves of notable individuals 

 Alexandra (stage name of Doris Nefedov) (1942–1969), singer (Zigeunerjunge)
 Hans Baur (1897–1993), chief pilot of Adolf Hitler
 Bernhard Borst (1883–1963), architect of the Borstei estate
 Karl-Heinz Borutta (1935–2002), footballer
 Jakob Bradl (1864–1919), sculptor
 Tilli Breidenbach (1910–1994), actress
 Michl Ehbauer (1899–1964), writer, humorist
 Maxl Graf (1933–1996), folk actor
 Gebhard Greiling (1910–2008), army doctor
 Adolf Hartmann (1900–1972), painter 
 Hugo Hartung (1902–1972), writer
 Ursula Herking (1912–1974), actress and cabaret artist (grave levelled)
 Toni Hiebeler (1930–1984), first man to climb the north-west wall of Monte Civetta in winter (1963) and author of various books about the Alps
 Michael Hinz (1939–2008), theatre and film actor
 Markus Koch (1879–1948), composer
 Robert Lembke (1913–1989), journalist and quizmaster
 Franz von Lenbach (1836–1904), artist
 Rudolf Maison (1854–1904), sculptor
 Karl Meitinger (1882–1970), architect
 Edmund Nick (1891–1974), composer
 Bernile Nienau (1926-1943), Jewish child who became friends with Adolf Hitler on her 7th birthday
 Alexander Pfänder (1870–1941), philosopher
 Timofei Prochorow (1894–2004), known as Väterchen Timofei, founder of the Ost-West-Friedenskirche ("East-West Peace Church") in Wiesenfeld, on the site of the present Olympiapark
 Ernst Röhm (1887–1934), Chief of Staff of the SA, in a small family grave
 Günther J. Schmidt (1918–2009), entrepreneur, owner of the TOGAL Works
 Hans Schuberth (1897–1976), Bundesminister for posts and telecommunications
 Hanns Seidel (1901–1961), Minister-President of Bavaria
 Princess Soraya (Soraya Esfandiary-Bakhtiari) (1932–2001), former wife of the Shah of Iran
 Eberhard Stanjek (1935–2001), sports reporter
 Günther Storck (1938–1993), priest, bishop sede vacante
 Wolfgang Unzicker (1925–2006), chess grand master
 Max Valier (1895–1930), rocket pioneer, author of science fiction novels
 Otto Voisard (1927–1992), chairman of MAN SE, general director of Steyr-Daimler-Puch
 Karl Schmitt-Walter (1900–1985), opera and lieder singer

Two graves recall the terror of the period of the Bavarian Soviet Republic. Countess Hella von Westarp (1887–1919; grave 9-6-12), secretary of the Thule Society, was shot in the hostage murders. The other gravestone is known as the "Pals' Grave" (Gesellengrab) and commemorates 22 young men, members of the Roman Catholic St. Joseph's Social Club (Gesellenverein St. Joseph) who in May 1919 were drinking in their local and thus missed the curfew. They were apprehended by a Berlin regiment, who took them for Spartacists. The young men were unable to convince their captors otherwise, it was popularly believed because of the difficulties of mutual understanding between Bavarians and Prussians, and all were shot.

Notes and references

Literature 
 Erich Scheibmayr (self-published, Munich):
Letzte Heimat, 1985
Wer? Wann? Wo? (3 parts), 1989, 1997, 2002

External links 

 München-Wiki: Der Westfriedhof 
 http://friedhof.stadt-muenchen.net: graves of famous people in the Westfriedhof 

Cemeteries in Munich
Parks and open spaces in Munich